Gillen is a hamlet on the Waternish peninsula of the island of Skye in the Scottish council area of Highland.

References

Populated places in the Isle of Skye